Southern Championship Wrestling (SCW) was a professional wrestling promotion that was founded in Marietta, Georgia by Jerry Blackwell and operated from 1988 to 1990, and was continued by his successor, Joe Pedicino, who ran the promotion as Georgia All-Star Wrestling for another year.

Though short-lived, the group showcased some of the top talent from the American Wrestling Association and National Wrestling Alliance as well as notable on-air talent including Pedicino, Rick Stewart, Rhubarb Jones, Paul Heyman, and booker Buck Robley. It was one of the top independent organizations in Georgia during the late-1980s, rivaling Jody Hamilton's Deep South Wrestling, and the state's last territory-era promotion prior to the collapse of the NWA territory system.

History
Southern Championship Wrestling was established in Georgia by Jerry Blackwell in early 1988. Blackwell, then a star in American Wrestling Association, had run shows under the "AWA Georgia" banner the previous year using talent from the AWA. One of its biggest shows was held at the Cobb Civic Center in Marietta and was headlined by Blackwell, Wahoo McDaniel, Sgt. Slaughter, The Iron Sheik, Curt Hennig, Jerry "The King" Lawler, and The Midnight Express (Dennis Condrey and Randy Rose). Condrey and Rose were scheduled to appear in SCW as the AWA World Tag Team Champions, however, the angle was dropped when Condrey was unable to appear. His place was taken by Comrade Busich and introduced by their manager, Paul E. Dangerously, as "Ravishing Randy and Comrade Busich, the substitute Midnight Express."

Blackwell eventually began promoting on a full-time basis with involvement from Joe Pedicino and others. The first events and TV tapings were held in January 1988; the second TV taping (January 24) was headlined by Bruiser Brody and drew 630 fans. Matches from these shows were first shown on a weekly syndicated TV program, Southern Championship Wrestling from Georgia, which aired live on certain TV stations. Dave Meltzer of the Wrestling Observer called these first tapings "a pretty lively and fun to watch indy show, and has better caliber wrestling than most indies". The first Southern Heavyweight Champion, "Gentleman" Chris Adams, won the championship by defeating Buck Robley in a tournament final on June 25, 1988, in Columbus, Georgia. The first Southern Tag Team Champions were crowned in a tournament final that same year in Macon, when "Wildfire" Tommy Rich and Ted Oates defeated Bob Orton, Jr. and "Dirty" Dick Slater. The show was taped mostly at Miss Kitty's in Marietta as well as occasional shows at The Memorial Gym in Rome, Georgia.

Territorial reach
Given the constraints of the NWA territory system, with the Southeast controlled by Jim Crockett Promotions, and the national expansion of World Wrestling Federation now in full swing, there was little opportunity for SCW to develop a larger territory of its own. The promotion was mostly limited to the southern Georgia area with regular shows in cities such as Alpharetta, Atlanta, Columbus, Georgia, Griffin, Macon and Marietta, Georgia; most of its television tapings took place at Gordon Clements' Alpharetta Auction Barn and Miss Kitty's Saloon in Marietta. Within its first three months, SCW was running between five and seven shows every two weeks and sold out shows in Marietta on at least two occasions.

Notable talent

With Blackwell's connections to the AWA and, to a certain extent, various NWA members, the promotion sported one of the top rosters in the Georgia independents. Austin Idol, Akio Sato, Bob Orton, Jr., David Sammartino, "Pretty Boy" Doug Somers, "Raging Bull" Manny Fernandez, and Boris Zhukov & Soldat Ustinov were among the AWA veterans who appeared for the promotion in addition to wrestlers from the Central States and Mid-South territories. Other stars included "Outlaw" Joel Deaton, Nick Busick, Ranger Ross, Joey Maggs, and Thunder and Lightning (Steve Lawler and Dino Minelli). SCW held the distinction of airing some of Bruiser Brody's final televised matches before his 1988 murder in Puerto Rico; SCW television footage was used on PWTW's "Bruiser Brody Tribute Show" that fall. Terry Funk and the Von Erich family also made appearances on early TV tapings. Promoter Rex Luther later provided undercard talent as well.

SCW also had important backstage and on-air personnel. Bill Dromo was introduced as the figurehead president. Randy "Pee Wee" Anderson was one of its referees. Rhubarb Jones, a popular morning radio DJ in Atlanta, and Joe Pedicino served as announcers, and were later joined by Rick Stewart from Central States Wrestling. A 22-year-old Paul Heyman, who was also working for Windy City Wrestling in Chicago, appeared as "Paul E. Dangerously" alongside the original Midnight Express (Dennis Condrey and Randy Rose) before moving on to World Championship Wrestling to feud with the Jim Cornette and the "new"  Midnight Express (Bobby Eaton and Stan Lane). Most importantly, Buck Robley returned to pro wrestling after a four-year absence to become the promotion's booker. SCW also marked the final appearance of longtime NWA star Mr. Wrestling II who feuded with Robley before retiring in 1989. Their feud began with Robley's surprise debut in the promotion by having himself sealed in a wooden crate and "delivered" to the ring while Mr. Wrestling II was being interview with Joe Pedicino. When the masked wrestler investigated the box, he was attacked by Robley. As booker, Robley introduced other creative ideas such as a "$10,000 Slam Battle Royal" held at the Marietta Civic Center.

Rivalry with Deep South Wrestling
SCW's talent pool and popular television program, in addition to limited national exposure via Joe Pedicino's Pro Wrestling This Week, saw the promotion quickly rise to the top of the Georgia independent circuit. The number one "outlaw" promotion at the time was Jody Hamilton's Deep South Wrestling out of Marietta. Hamilton and his training facility had a working relationship with Jim Crockett Promotions and enjoyed the use its stars. On the independent scene, both promotions competed for talent and shared many of the same wrestlers. Mr. Wrestling II, for example, jumped back and forth between SCW and DSW during this period.

Within two months of SCW's debut, Dave Meltzer's Wrestling Observer was reporting "a major war" between the two organizations. Deep South Wrestling ran on Channel 69 which was a competitor against the station that aired Pedicino's "Pro Wrestling This Week". The rival station had created its own Saturday night wrestling bloc to compete directly with Pedecino's show, but failed to challenge him in the ratings. For this and other reasons, such as Pedicino airing SCW programming, he and his co-host Boni Blackstone were drawn into the Blackwell-Hamilton war. In February 1988, DSW parodied Pedicino and Blackstone on its television program with the following skit;

SCW also poked fun at Crockett's promotion on occasion. In an appearance by Michael Hayes of The Fabulous Freebirds, he joked with an SCW crowd "[The NWA] may be the major league, but their checks are minor league." The year-long rivalry between SCW and DSW ended when, following an in-ring injury, Hamilton sold off the promotion in 1988.

Demise
Blackwell continued to operate SCW throughout the steady decline of the National Wrestling Alliance. By end of the decade, however, the NWA's decades-old territory system had ended while the WWF came to dominate the U.S. wrestling industry. Losing interest in the promotion, Blackwell decided to close down SCW in early 1990. It was the last-ever territory-era promotion to run in the state of Georgia.

Georgia All-Star Wrestling
Shortly after Jerry Blackwell pulled out of SCW, Joe Pedicino decided to continue on by himself. In May 1990, the promotion was relaunched as "Georgia All-Star Wrestling". Though no longer having access to AWA talent, Pedicino was able to bring in former wrestlers from Jim Crockett Promotions as an announcer for the promotion. Future WCW star Marcus Bagwell made his debut in the promotion under the name Fabian. He was also able to retain many of SCW's former Georgia-area stars. These were mostly independent wrestlers such as Jimmy Holiday, Tony Zane, Billy Starr, John Michaels. Joel Deaton, Nick Busich, and Steve "The Brawler" Lawler.

In early 1990, Pedicino hired Scott Hudson and Steve Prazak as announcers for the promotion. According to Hudson in a later interview, both men had been fans of "Pro Wrestling This Week" and impressed Pedicino when they volunteered to replace the regular announcer following a poor performance at an GASW show in Carrollton, Georgia. Initially working without pay, they were eventually hired full-time. With their experience in radio and television, they became valuable members of the promotion. Pedicino continued running GASW until 1991 when he and former USWA commissioner Max Andrews decided to start a new promotion, the Global Wrestling Federation, in Dallas, Texas.

Alumni

Male wrestlers

Stables and tag teams

Managers and valets

Commentators and interviewers

Referees

Other personnel

Championships and programming

Championships

Programming

References

Further reading
 Hamilton, Joe and Scott Teal. Assassin: The Man Behind The Mask. Hendersonville, TN: Crowbar Press, 2006. .

American companies established in 1988
American companies disestablished in 1990
1988 establishments in Georgia (U.S. state)
Independent professional wrestling promotions based in Georgia (U.S. state)
National Wrestling Alliance members